Adriana Barna (born 21 May 1978) is a retired German tennis player. The younger sister of former professional tennis player Anca Barna resides in Nuremberg, Germany.

ITF Circuit finals

Singles: 6 (2–4)

Doubles: 15 (3–12)

Head-to-head record
Raluca Sandu 0–1
Cătălina Cristea 0–1

External links 
 
 

German female tennis players
Romanian female tennis players
German people of Romanian descent
Romanian emigrants to Germany
1978 births
Living people
Sportspeople from Cluj-Napoca